Henry John Minarik (September 1, 1927 – March 12, 2018) was an American football tackle who played for the Pittsburgh Steelers. He played college football at Michigan State University, having previously attended Central High School.  He is a member of the Greater Flint Area Sports Hall of Fame.

References

1927 births
2018 deaths
American football ends
Michigan State Spartans football players
Pittsburgh Steelers players
Players of American football from Flint, Michigan